Castle Villa AFC are an association football (soccer) team based in Castledermot, County Kildare, Ireland.

The team was formed by Walter Brookes in 1969.  Commonly known as 'The Villa', there are two senior teams and many underage teams, ranging from U8 to U18. The jerseys are either solid blue with white lining, or blue with white stripes.

Mullarney Park, located on the Baltinglass road out of Castledermot, is the home pitch.

Two of the club's most successful teams of the past were the 1979 team which won the Counties Cup and the Sheeran Cup winners of 1984 and 1989.

As of 2014, Castle Villa were playing in the Kildare & District Football League - Senior Division, they are the only team never to have been out of the top flight of the KDFL and won the 2006 league title, by beating Carbury in the final game of the season 4-0. They won the Lumsden League Cup in 2009, when the League changed to a Summer Season, coming from behind three times to defeat Liffey Celtic in extra time. They also won the cup in 2016 when they once again beat Liffey Celtic.

Villa have taken the league and cup double twice, in 1999 and 2001. There are only two teams who have won the Charles R. Wynne Senior Division three times, Castle Villa are one of those teams. Villa have won more Lumsden cup trophies than any other club in Kildare, the Lumsden cup is the flagship cup competition in Kildare.

Former players for Villa include Bryan Byrne.

In 2019, Castle Villa celebrated its 50th anniversary. Current and formers members and players gathered for a Gala Dinner in the Woodford Dolmen Hotel, Carlow. The guest of honour was Brian Kerr.

Association football clubs established in 1969
Association football clubs in County Kildare
1969 establishments in Ireland